Eliseu Ganda (born 7 September 1968) is an Angolan sailor. He competed in the men's 470 event at the 1992 Summer Olympics.

References

External links
 

1968 births
Living people
Angolan male sailors (sport)
Olympic sailors of Angola
Sailors at the 1992 Summer Olympics – 470
Place of birth missing (living people)